Velu or Velow in Iran may refer to:
 Velu, Mazandaran, a village in Iran
 Velu, North Khorasan, a village in Iran